The Men's 20 kilometre individual biathlon competition at the 1976 Winter Olympics was held on 6 February, at Seefeld.  Each miss of the target cost two minutes, while hitting the outer circle cost one minute.

Summary 

Defending world champion Heikki Ikola was among the leaders after the first shooting around, but he trailed Soviet Aleksandr Tikhonov, who set a torrid pace. Tikhonov led by thirty seconds at the halfway point, despite missing a shot, and after shooting clear the third time, the Soviet was up by  more than a minute on Ikola and Nikolay Kruglov, the worlds silver medalist. However, at the final shot, Tikhonov collapsed, taking six penalty minutes to fall out of medal contention. Ikola took two minutes in penalties as well, meaning Kruglov, who had just one minute penalty, was able to pass him to win the gold medal. Aleksandr Elizarov could have taken silver with a better shooting performance than Ikola, but matched the Finn with two minutes in penalties, and while he cut Ikola's lead in half on the final section, he was left in third place. Tikhonov ended up with the fastest ski time by almost two full minutes, but his late misses meant he ended up in fifth.

Results
Penalties refer to minutes added, as described above, not (necessarily) number of targets missed.

References

Individual